Gamley is a surname. Notable people with the surname include:

 Douglas Gamley (1924–1998), Australian composer
 Henry Snell Gamley (1865–1928), Scottish sculptor

See also
 Gamleys
 Gatley (surname)